Marlbrook is a hamlet in Shropshire, England, right on the border with Worcestershire.

References

Villages in Shropshire